The 2012–13 UMass Minutemen basketball team represented the University of Massachusetts Amherst during the 2012–13 NCAA Division I men's basketball season. The Minutemen, led by fifth year head coach Derek Kellogg, played their home games at the William D. Mullins Memorial Center and were members of the Atlantic 10 Conference. They finished the season 21–12, 9–7 in A-10 play to finish in a tie for sixth place. They advanced to the semifinals of the Atlantic 10 tournament where they lost to VCU. They were invited to the 2013 NIT as the highest A-10 team not to go to the NCAA Tournament, where they lost in the first round to Stony Brook.

Roster

Schedule

|-
!colspan=12| Exhibition

|-
!colspan=12| Regular season

|-
!colspan=9| 2013 Atlantic 10 men's basketball tournament

|-
!colspan=9|2013 NIT

References

UMass Minutemen basketball seasons
UMass
UMass